Sandra Anne Brondello (born 20 August 1968) is an Australian women's basketball coach, and the current head coach of the New York Liberty of the WNBA. Brondello played in Australia, Germany and the WNBA before retiring to become a coach. The 5 ft 7 in (1.70 m) Brondello is one of Australia's all-time best shooting guards. She played on Australia's "Opals" national team at four Summer Olympics, and won three medals (one bronze, two silvers). She attended the Australian Institute of Sport in 1986–1987, and was inducted to the Australian Basketball Hall of Fame in 2010.

Playing career
Brondello grew up in Mackay, Queensland, where her parents had a sugar cane farm. At the age of 9, she started to play basketball in a grass court her father built in the backyard Brondello's career began in Australia's Women's National Basketball League, where she was named the Australian Basketball Player of the Year in 1992. Brondello played for 10 seasons in the WNBL, reaching the playoffs on three occasions and being named Most Valuable Player in 1995 as a member of the Brisbane Blazers. She also played between 1992 and 2002 in Germany for BTV Wuppertal, winning ten national championships and the 1995–96 FIBA Women's European Champions Cup.

Brondello started her WNBA career in 1998 by being selected in the fourth round (34th overall) by the newly formed Detroit Shock, becoming an All-Star in the first WNBA All-Star Game in 1999. She was selected by the Indiana Fever in late 1999's expansion draft, but never played a game for them, being traded to the Miami Sol along with a first-round pick for Stephanie McCarty. After sitting out of the 2002 season due to a foot injury playing for Wuppertal during the WNBA offseason, Brondello signed as a free agent with the Seattle Storm in 2003, joining fellow Australians Lauren Jackson and Tully Bevilaqua. Brondello was one of the top three-point shooters in league history, her .410 percentage ranking fourth all-time.

On the Australian National Team, Brondello joined the team before the age of 18 and remained on the Opals for 17 years, and her 302 games made Brondello the third most capped Australian player, behind Robyn Maher and Karen Dalton. Brondello's tournaments with Australia include four World Championships, with two bronze medals, and four Olympic tournaments, with two silver medals and a bronze. Twice she sat out of the WNBA due to Olympic commitments, in 2000 and 2004. The 2004 tournament in Athens turned out to be Brondello's last major event, with her afterwards investing in a coaching career.

Coaching career
In 2005, Brondello was named an assistant coach of the San Antonio Silver Stars. She was promoted to head coach in February 2010.

In 2009 Brondello was inducted into the Queensland Sport Hall of Fame.

Brondello and her husband, associate head coach Olaf Lange, were fired by the Silver Stars in September 2010. Brondello finished her only season as head coach with a 14–20 record, third best in the Western Conference. They were eliminated in the first round of the playoffs by Phoenix two games to none. General manager Dan Hughes regained the title of head coach in January 2011, returning to the dual role he held before promoting Brondello. Brondello would become an assistant coach for the Los Angeles Sparks for the 2011 season.

In November 2013, Brondello was hired by the Phoenix Mercury to replace interim coach Russ Pennell. In her inaugural season, Brondello led the Mercury – which featured a former Opals teammate, Penny Taylor – to the league's top record and highest single-season win total in WNBA history, with 29 wins and 5 losses, earning her a Coach of the Year Award. The Mercury eventually won the 2014 WNBA Finals by sweeping the Chicago Sky.

In April 2017, Brondello was appointed head coach of the Australian women's basketball team, the Opals. She will combine this role with her WNBA coaching duties.

On December 6, 2021, the Phoenix Mercury announced that the team and head coach Sandy Brondello had mutually agreed to part ways and that her contract, which expired after the 2021 season, would not be renewed.

On January 7, 2022, Brondello was officially named the head coach of New York Liberty.

 

|-
| align="left" | SAS
| align="left" |2010
|34||14||20|||| align="center" |3rd in West||2||0||2||
| align="center" |Lost in Western Conference Semi-Finals
|- ! style="background:#FDE910;"
| align="left" | PHO
| align="left" |2014
| 34 || 29|| 5|||| align="center" |1st in West||8 ||7 ||1 ||
| align="center" |Won WNBA Finals
|-
| align="left" | PHO
| align="left" |2015
| 34 || 20|| 14|||| align="center" |2nd in West||4 ||2 ||2 ||
| align="center" |Lost in Western Conference Finals
|-
| align="left" | PHO
| align="left" |2016
| 34 || 16|| 18|||| align="center" |4th in West||5 ||2 ||3 ||
| align="center" |Lost in WNBA Semi-Finals
|-
| align="left" | PHO
| align="left" |2017
| 34 || 18|| 16|||| align="center" |4th in West||5 ||2 ||3 ||
| align="center" |Lost in WNBA Semi-Finals
|-
| align="left" | PHO
| align="left" |2018
| 34 || 20|| 14|||| align="center" |2nd in West||7 ||4 ||3 ||
| align="center" |Lost in WNBA Semi-Finals
|-
| align="left" | PHO
| align="left" |2019
| 34 || 15|| 19|||| align="center" |5th in West|| 1 || 0 || 1 ||
| align="center" |Lost in 1st Round
|-
| align="left" | PHO
| align="left" |2020
| 22 || 13 || 9 |||| align="center" |5th in West||2 ||1 ||1 ||
| align="center" |Lost in 2nd Round
|-
| align="left" | PHO
| align="left" |2021
| 32 || 19 || 13 |||| align="center" |4th in West|| 11 || 6 || 5 ||
| align="center" |Lost in WNBA Finals
|-
| align="left" | NYL
| align="left" |2022
| 36 || 16 || 20 |||| align="center" |4th in East|| 3 || 1 || 2 ||
| align="center" |Lost in 1st Round
|-class="sortbottom"
| align="left" |Career
| || 328 || 180 || 148 |||| || 48 || 25 || 23 ||

Personal life
Brondello is married to Olaf Lange, who is also a basketball coach and an assistant for the Liberty.

See also
 List of Australian WNBA players
 WNBL Top Shooter Award
 WNBL All-Star Five

References

External links

WNBA player file 2014 archive

1968 births
Sportspeople from Mackay, Queensland
Living people
Australian expatriate basketball people in Germany
Australian expatriate basketball people in Spain
Australian expatriate basketball people in the United States
Australian Institute of Sport basketball (WNBL) players
Australian women's basketball coaches
Australian women's basketball players
Basketball players at the 1988 Summer Olympics
Basketball players at the 1996 Summer Olympics
Basketball players at the 2000 Summer Olympics
Basketball players at the 2004 Summer Olympics
Detroit Shock players
Los Angeles Sparks coaches
Medalists at the 1996 Summer Olympics
Medalists at the 2000 Summer Olympics
Medalists at the 2004 Summer Olympics
Miami Sol players
New York Liberty coaches
Olympic basketball players of Australia
Olympic bronze medalists for Australia
Olympic coaches
Olympic medalists in basketball
Olympic silver medalists for Australia
Phoenix Mercury coaches
San Antonio Stars coaches
Seattle Storm players
Shooting guards
Women's National Basketball Association All-Stars
Women's National Basketball Association championship-winning head coaches